Rhycherus is a genus of frogfishes found in the Indian and Pacific Oceans.

Species
There are currently two recognized species in this genus:
 Rhycherus filamentosus Castelnau, 1872 (Tasselled anglerfish)
 Rhycherus gloveri Pietsch, 1984 (Glover's anglerfish)

References

Antennariidae
Marine fish genera
Taxa named by James Douglas Ogilby